Preetha Vijayakumar (born 10 January 1982) is an former Indian actress.

Career
Preetha had first signed up to portray the leading role in Ravi Raja Pinisetty's Telugu film Rukmini opposite Vineeth in 1997, but delays meant her Tamil film Sandhippoma released first. She is noted for her role in the movie Padayappa as Rajinikanth's daughter.

Personal life

She was born as second child to actor  Vijayakumar and actress Manjula. She married director Hari in 2002 and has three sons.

Filmography

References

External links
 

Living people
Tamil actresses
Indian film actresses
Actresses in Malayalam cinema
Actresses in Tamil cinema
Actresses from Chennai
Actresses in Telugu cinema
20th-century Indian actresses
21st-century Indian actresses
1975 births
Actresses in Kannada cinema